The Pata Island massacre refers to an event that took place on February 12, 1981, on Pata Island, Sulu province in the Philippines. More than 100 Philippine Army officers and men were killed by Moro natives in what was called by retired Major General Delfin Castro as "the biggest number of casualties incurred by the Armed Forces of the Philippines in a single incident since the start of the conflict in Mindanao and had the dubious distinction of achieving the biggest losses in AFP firearms and equipment in a single incident." An estimated 3,000 Tausug civilians, including women and children, were killed in months of shelling by military forces in 1982 and was tagged as the Pata Island massacre.

Events prior to massacre
The 1st Infantry Division of the Philippine Army conducted an operation on Pata Island on February 9, 1981, after receiving reports of landings being made there by Moro National Liberation Front elements. The 31st Infantry Battalion was at the forefront of this operation, assisted by two other battalions. After being assured by local barangay leaders that no MNLF forces had landed, the 31st Infantry Battalion began to withdraw its troops from the island on February 12, 1981, leaving its Headquarters Service Company along with battalion commander Lieutenant Colonel Jacinto Sardual.

The massacre   
Lt. Col. Sardual called on a Civilian Home Defense Forces commander Unad Masillam before his planned departure. Masillam and his men then accompanied Sardual back to the Headquarters Service Company's encampment, at which point Masillam asked Sardual to form up the company and stack up their weapons so that both sides could conduct a farewell ceremony. Sardual, who was a dental officer, complied and gave the order for his men to do so.

The Moros surrounded the government troops and then opened fire using automatic rifles. Responding soldiers who later discovered the bodies of their dead comrades reported finding spent .30 caliber shell casings and links at the Moros' firing positions, indicating the use of machine guns. Accounts vary regarding the number of dead Philippine Army troopers; reports indicate a body count of 119 and 124. Some of the bodies were found with defensive wounds on their arms inflicted by bladed weapons; many bodies were scorched, indicating that an attempt to burn them was made. Three of the company survived, all of them wounded.

Retaliation
The Philippine Air Force and the Philippine Navy bombed and shelled the island for nearly two months in support of Philippine Army search operations to capture the perpetrators, though 300 rebels may have evaded capture by escaping to Sabah, Malaysia. Juan Ponce Enrile, then Defense Minister, described the perpetrators as simply "armed men", probably smugglers or remnants of the Moro National Liberation Front.

3,000 Tausug civilians, including women and children, were killed in months of military shelling in 1982 and was tagged as a massacre.

References

1981 in the Philippines
Massacres in 1981
February 1981 events in Asia
Massacres in the Philippines
Moro conflict
Rebellions in the Philippines
History of Sulu
Presidency of Ferdinand Marcos
Massacres under the Marcos dictatorship